Ariane Flight VA245 is the Ariane 5 space launch of BepiColombo that took place on 20 October 2018 at 01:45:28UTC from the Guiana Space Centre.

Payload 
The payload of the launcher was the BepiColombo spacecraft.

BepiColombo 

It comprises 3 different elements that will remain attached together during launch and cruise to Mercury: the Mercury Transfer Module (MTM), the Mercury Planetary Orbiter (MPO), and the Mercury Magnetospheric Orbiter (Mio or MMO). The assembly was accommodated inside the long version of the upper stage fairing. BepiColombo, a joint mission between ESA and JAXA, is Europe's first space mission to Mercury. The European modules (MTM and MPO) were designed and manufactured by Airbus at its Friedrichshafen site in Germany as prime contractor for ESA, heading a consortium of 83 companies from 16 countries. The Japanese module (Mio) was built by ISAS for JAXA.

Mission overview

Launch date 
The  Arianespace launch of 2018 took place on 20 October 2018 at 01:45:28UTC (19 October 2018 22:45:28 local time) from Ariane Launch Complex No. 3 (ELA 3) in Kourou, French Guiana.

Pre-flight activities 
The different parts of the spacecraft arrived in French Guiana between April 24 and May 9. Deployment testing of BepiColombo MTM 2 solar arrays (which will generate up to 11.2 kW of power) were performed at the Guiana Space Centre in the SC5 facilities. The MMO was integrated on the MPO between August 20 and 21. They were both integrated on the MTM between September 19 and 20 to complete BepiColombo. BepiColombo was assembled with its payload adapter on October 4, integrated on the launch vehicle on October 9, and enclosed within the fairing on October 11. The launch readiness review toko place on 17 October 2018 in Kourou to authorise the start of the final operations.

Orbit 
It is expected to be captured by and start orbiting Mercury approximately on 5 December 2025, after a 7-year travel that will include several flybys of the Earth, Venus, and Mercury itself.

References

External links 
 Presskit for Ariane Flight VA245 by Arianespace

VA245, Ariane flight
2018 in spaceflight
October 2018 events in South America
2018 in French Guiana
Rocket launches in 2018